Franziska Kersten (born 19 December 1968) is a German veterinarian and politician of the Social Democratic Party (SPD) who has been serving as a member of the Bundestag since 2021, representing the Börde – Jerichower Land district.

Early life and career
Kersten was born in 1968 in the East German town of Lutherstadt Wittenberg and grew up in Pretzsch, Wittenberg. She studied veterinary medicine at the University of Leipzig.

From 2019 to 2020, Kersten served as vice president of the German Environment Agency (UBA). From 2020 to 2021, she worked at the Federal Ministry for the Environment, Nature Conservation and Nuclear Safety.

Political career
Kersten was elected directly to the Bundestag in the 2021 federal elections. In the negotiations to form a so-called traffic light coalition of the SPD, the Green Party and the Free Democratic Party (FDP) following the elections, she was part of her party's delegation in the working group on agriculture and nutrition, co-chaired by Till Backhaus, Renate Künast and Carina Konrad.

In parliament, Kersten has since been serving on the Committee on the Environment, Nature Conservation, Nuclear Safety and Consumer Protection, the Committee on Food and Agriculture and the Parliamentary Advisory Council on Sustainable Development. Within her parliamentary group, she is part of working groups on criminal policy and on the environment, nature conservation, nuclear safety and consumer protection.

In addition to her committee assignments, Kersten has been a member of the German delegation to the Franco-German Parliamentary Assembly. She has also been an alternate member of the German delegation to the Parliamentary Assembly of the Council of Europe (PACE) since 2022. In the Assembly, she serves on the Committee on Social Affairs, Health and Sustainable Development; the Committee on Culture, Science, Education and Media; and the Sub-Committee on Culture, Diversity and Heritage.

Other activities
 International Federation for Equestrian Sports (FEI), Member

Personal life
Kersten is married to a fellow veterinarian.

References 

Living people
1968 births
Social Democratic Party of Germany politicians
Members of the Bundestag 2021–2025
21st-century German politicians